William Joseph Bryan, Jr. (1926–1977) was an American physician and a pioneering hypnotist. He was one of the founders of  modern hypnotherapy and his work notably found use in psychological warfare during the Cold War. He was a great-grandson of United States Secretary of State William Jennings Bryan.

Career and work
He held an MD, JD, and PhD. He started his career as a military psychiatrist, and was involved in research for the CIA, including the Project ARTICHOKE and its successor, the Project MKUltra (popularly known as the CIA's mind control program), a research project into behavioral engineering of humans. As part of his work for the CIA, he developed techniques of what he called "hypno-conditioning." His published research from the era focused on the forensic and military range of psychological research. He would later focus on legal hypnosis.

William Joseph Bryan Jr is famous for inducing Albert DeSalvo's confession to multiple homicide under hypnosis.

On May 4 of 1955, William J. Bryan founded the American Institute of Hypnosis, and he then edited the institute's Journal of the American Institute of Hypnosis.

He is credited with creating the 'Bryan Method' of hypnoanalysis.

According to hypnosis practitioners such as Marc Aymar, Francoise Lotery and Felicia Mocanu, William J. Bryan Jr MD is recognized as one of the two central figures in the field of hypnosis during the 20th Century and they also claim that he was also the first full-time medical practitioner of hypnosis in the USA.

The second central figure, they claim, was Milton H. Erickson (1901-1980).

Controversy

William Turner and Jonn Christian hypothesized in The Assassination of Robert F. Kennedy that Bryan was responsible for inducing Sirhan Sirhan to fire blanks at Robert F. Kennedy with posthypnotic suggestion. Other conspiracy theorists have repeated this claim.

Death

Bryan was reportedly found dead in a Las Vegas hotel room on March 4, 1977, of a suspected heart attack, and buried in Hollywood.

Bibliography

 Legal Aspects of Hypnosis, 1962
 Religious Aspects of Hypnosis, 1962. Republished as Leave Something to God by Relaxed Books 1998, Winfield, IL
 The New Self-Hypnosis, 1967 (with Paul Adams)
 The Chosen Ones: Or, The Psychology of Jury Selection, 1971

References

1977 deaths
American hypnotists
1926 births
20th-century American physicians
American psychiatrists
American psychologists